Shanjo (Sanjo) is a Bantu language of Zambia. Maho (2009) lists it as distinct from Tonga, which it has sometimes been classified as a dialect of.

References

Bantu languages
Languages of Zambia
Kavango languages